Ashoka the HERO is a 2011 Indian animated film written and directed by Gaurav Jain. The film is edited by Naren Mojidra.

Synopsis 
An eight-year-old school going boy got some hidden magical powers, and he must use them to save mankind from evils.

Voice cast and crew 
 Amol Kadam
 Deepak Kale
 Parashar Rane
 Nitin Satam
 Ravi Zade
 Naresh Bhurke
 Sanghpal Chavan
 Titus Kujur
 Sachin Pednekar

Layout artist 
 
 Ajay Nakti

Key artist 
 
 Sumit Jaiswal (as Sumeet Jaiswal)

Soundtrack 
The film's original score is given by Justin-Uday and its lyrics is written by Rekha Nigam.

Track listing 
1. "Here He Comes Ashoka" by Shibani Kashyap

2. "Roshni se" - Instrumental

Release 
This film is released in theatres on 7 January 2011 but got 25 prints only.

Box office 
It earned ₹50,000 on first day, ₹1,50,000 on first weekend and a sum of ₹2,10,000 on its first week.

References